Washington is a town in the City of Sunderland district of Tyne and Wear, England. Historically part of County Durham, it is the ancestral settlement of the Washington family, which George Washington descended from. 

It is located between Chester-le-Street, Gateshead and Sunderland. Washington was designated a new town in 1964 and became part of the Borough of Sunderland in 1974, the borough became a city in 1992. It has expanded dramatically since its designation, by new villages created and reassignment of areas from Chester-le-Street, to house overspill from surrounding cities. At the 2011 census, Washington had a population of 67,085, compared to 53,388 in 2001.

History

Toponymy
Early references appear around 1096 in Old English as Wasindone. The etymological origin is disputed and there are several proposed theories for how the name "Washington" came about. Early interpretations included Wasindone (people of the hill by the stream, 1096), or Wassyngtona (settlement of Wassa's people, 1183).

Hwæsa 
The origins of the name Washington are not fully known. The most supported theory (especially amongst local historians) is that Washington is derived from Anglo-Saxon Hwæsingatūn, which roughly means "estate of the descendants (family) of Hwæsa". Hwæsa (usually rendered Wassa or Wossa in modern English) is an Old English name meaning "wheat sheaf".

Due to the evolution of English grammar, modern English lacks the Germanic grammatical features that permeated Anglo-Saxon English. This adds an air of confusion for most in regard to the name Hwæsingatūn. It is essentially composed of three main (albeit grammatically altered) elements:
"Hwæsa" – most likely the name of a local Anglo-Saxon chieftain or farmer.
"ing" – a Germanic component that has lost its original context in English: ing means roughly "[derived] of/from". In the name Hwæsingatūn, "ing" is conjugated to "inga" in accordance with the genitive plural declension of OE.
"tūn" – root of the modern English "town", and is a cognate of German Zaun (fence), Dutch tuin (garden) and Icelandic tún (paddock). The word means "fenced off estate" or more accurately "estate with defined boundaries".

The combined elements (with all correct conjugations in place) therefore create the name Hwæsingatūn with a full and technical meaning of "the estate of the descendants of Hwæsa".

However, there has been no evidence found of any chieftain/land owner/farmer in the area by the name of Hwæsa, although any such records from the time would likely have been long lost by now.

Washing
Another of the popular origin theories is that Washington is in fact derived from the Old English verb wascan and the noun dūn meaning "hill"; thus making the name Wascandūn, meaning "washing hill". This theory likely originates from the proximity of the river Wear to the actual Anglo-Saxon hall at the time (most likely where Washington Old Hall stands today).

This idea is not backed by linguistic evidence. Combining the two Old English words "wascan" and "dūn" would actually have meant "washed hill" and not "washing hill". Also, the Old English "dūn" meant a range of gently rolling hills, as evidenced by the naming of the North and South Downs in southern England.

Old Hall 

The Old Hall may have been built by William de Hertburn, who moved to the area in 1183. As was the custom, he took the name of his new estates (Wessyngtonlands), and became William de Wessyngton. By 1539, when the family moved to Sulgrave Manor in Northamptonshire, the spelling "Washington" had been adopted.

The present Hall is an early 17th-century small English manor house of sandstone. Only the foundations and the arches between the Kitchen and the Great Hall remain of the original house.

George Washington connection 

William de Wessyngton (originally William Bayard, later de Hertburne) was a forebear of George Washington, the first president of the United States, after whom the US capital, a state and many other places in the United States are named. Though George Washington's great-grandfather John Washington left for Virginia from Northamptonshire, Washington Old Hall was the family home of George Washington's ancestors. The present structure incorporates small parts of the medieval home in which they lived. American Independence Day is marked each year by a ceremony at Washington Old Hall.

Dame Margaret's Hall

Sir Isaac Lowthian Bell and his wife Margaret, grandparents of Gertrude Bell, lived in Washington New Hall on The Avenue. After Margaret's death in 1871, Sir Isaac set up an orphanage in the house, named Dame Margaret Home in his late wife's honour. It later became a Dr Barnardo's home until World War II. After the war, it was taken over by the National Coal Board as a training centre. It is now a private residence.

Building the New Town 

Washington's design was developed through the New Towns concept aiming to achieve sustainable socio-economic growth. The new town is divided into small self-sufficient "villages". It was originally also divided into the 15 numbered districts, a fate that confused many visitors to the area.The new town's numbered districts have gradually been phased out (for example on road signs) and replaced with village names.

A lot of the land that makes up the town was purchased from the Lambton family, Earls of Durham who own the estate of the same name, which includes their ancestral home, Lambton Castle.

In 1970, Washington hosted the English Schools Athletic Association (ESAA) annual National Championships, attended by the then Lord Lieutenant of County Durham. On 15 November 1977, the very first SavaCentre hypermarket (a venture between Sainsbury's and British Home Stores) opened at The Galleries. By 2005, however, it had been rebranded as a traditional Sainsbury's as the SavaCentre brand was phased out.

Geography
The town is made up of villages:
Donwell
Usworth (originally Great Usworth)
Concord
Sulgrave
Albany
Glebe
Barmston
Biddick
Washington Village (the original village and location of the Old Hall)
Columbia
Blackfell
Oxclose
Ayton
Lambton
Fatfield
Harraton
Rickleton
 Mount Pleasant (14), it is south of the River Wear therefore having a DH4 Postcode (Houghton le Spring).

The town also has several industrial estates, named after famous local engineers, such as Parsons, Armstrong, Stephenson, Crowther, Pattinson, Swan and Emerson.

Community and culture

The has a Wildfowl and Wetlands Trust nature reserve and The Washington 'F' Pit mining museum. The Washington Arts Centre is a converted farm building. The Centre includes an exhibition gallery, community theatre, artist studios and a recording studio. The North East Aircraft Museum occupies part of the old RAF Usworth base. The Nissan plant takes up much of the rest. The municipal airport previously run from the site was closed to make way for the Nissan plant.

Industry 

Historically, Washington was heavily involved in the coal industry with a number of pits. One of these in the Albany district of Washington is preserved as the 'F' Pit Museum (pits in Washington were named alphabetically e.g. the 'F' Pit). A number of the old communities of Washington grew up around the pits (e.g. the modern area of Usworth partly grew up around the Usworth mine and the area was known as Usworth Colliery (and still is to some of the older generation). In support of the mines, there was a series of wagonways and later railway lines to transport the coal. The wagonways took coal to Staithes on the River Wear, where it could be loaded onto barges to be taken to the oceangoing vessels at Sunderland.

Washington was also involved in the chemical industry and the Washington Chemical Works was a major employer in the 19th century. This later became the Cape/Newalls Works, which produced insulation. The Pattinson Town area of Washington grew up around the chemical works. This area is now Pattinson industrial estate and Teal Farm housing estate.

Currently, Washington's main industries include textiles, electronics, car assembly, chemicals and electrical goods. The Nissan automotive plant is a major employer. Nissan is the largest private-sector employer in the City of Sunderland.

Goodyear Tire and Rubber Company, the American tyre production giant, opened a new factory in Washington in 1968. However, it closed on 5 July 2006 with the loss of 585 jobs.

Education 
There are several primary, secondary schools and colleges in the villages of Washington.

Primary schools 
 Albany Village Primary
 Barmston Village Primary
 Biddick Primary School
 Fatfield Primary School
 George Washington School (formerly High Usworth)
 Holley Park Primary School
 John F. Kennedy Primary School
 Lambton Primary School
 Oxclose Primary
 Rickleton Primary School
 St Bedes Primary School
 St John Boste RC Primary School
 St Joseph's Roman Catholic Primary School
 Usworth Colliery
 Usworth Grange
 Wessington Primary – (formerly Glebe Primary)

Secondary schools 
 Biddick Academy
 Oxclose Community Academy
 St Robert of Newminster Catholic School
 Washington Academy

Colleges 
 St Robert of Newminster Sixth Form
 Usworth Sixth Form

Other 
The North East of England Japanese Saturday School (北東イングランド補習授業校 Hokutō Ingurando Hoshū Jugyō Kō), a Japanese weekend supplementary school, holds its classes in the Oxclose Community School in Oxclose.

Sport 
Washington F.C. is a club based in the Northern League Division Two which is the tenth level of the English game.

In 2005, Washington R.F.C was established. The club currently plays in Durham and Northumberland Division 3.

Politics 

Washington is part of the Washington and Sunderland West parliamentary constituency and is represented in the House of Commons by Sharon Hodgson of the Labour Party.

Transport 

There is a major bus station situated at The Galleries, and another at Concord in the north of Washington. The primary provider of transport (buses) in the area is Go North East, with local services as well as connections to Newcastle upon Tyne, Sunderland, and many other towns and cities in the region.

Major roads run through Washington: the A182, the A1231 (Sunderland Highway) and the A195 all connect to the A1(M) motorway (which acts as the western boundary of Washington proper) or its feeder, the A194. Washington Services is situated between Junctions 64 and 65 of the A1(M), and incorporates a Travelodge.

The town's  closed to passengers in the 1960s due to the Beeching Cuts and to freight in 1991. The line was lifted and mothballed by Network Rail and partly is in use as an unmarked footpath. In June 2009, the Association of Train Operating Companies called for a scheme funding the reopening of 33 stations (including the town's station) on 14 lines closed by the Beeching Axe and seven new-build parkway stations. The first stage of a business case was published in 2022, this involved extending the Tyne and Wear Metro to Washington if Government funding was secured.

Notable people 

Gertrude Bell was born at Washington Hall.
The musician Bryan Ferry (of Roxy Music fame) comes from Washington and attended Washington Grammar School (now Washington Academy).
Heather Mills, notable for marrying Paul McCartney, attended Usworth Grange Primary School and Usworth Comprehensive School.
The musician Toni Halliday from the band Curve went to Washington School (Comprehensive).
Leeds United and England footballer Billy Furness was born in Washington and started his football career playing for Usworth Colliery
Sunderland, Everton and England goalkeeper Jordan Pickford was born in Washington.

References

External links 

Detailed historical record about Washington "F" Pit
Sunderland City Council
Official Website Of The Galleries

 
Towns in Tyne and Wear
New towns in England
New towns started in the 1960s
Unparished areas in Tyne and Wear
City of Sunderland